Gabriel Hawawini (born August 29, 1947) is an Emeritus Professor of Finance at INSEAD business school where he held the Henry Grunfeld Chair in Investment Banking from 1996 to 2013 and served as dean from 2000 to 2006, spearheading the institution's global expansion from its original campus in France into Asia (Singapore) and the Middle East (Abu Dhabi).

Selected publications 
‘Finance for Executives: Managing for Value Creation’, seventh edition, Cengage (2022)
'The Internationalization of Higher Education and Business Schools: A Critical Review’, Springer (2016)
‘The Future of Business Schools’, Journal of Management Development (November 2005) 
‘The Home Country in the Age of Globalization: How Much Does it Matter for Firm Performance?’, Journal of World Business (May 2004)
‘Is Performance Driven by Industry- or Firm-Specific Factors? A New Look at the Evidence’, Strategic Management Journal (January 2003)
‘Seasonality in the Risk-Return Relationship: Some International Evidence’, Journal of Finance (March 1987)
‘Friction in the Trading Process and the Estimation of Systematic Risk’, Journal of Financial Economics (August 1983)
‘A Mean-Standard Deviation Exposition of the Theory of the Firm Under Uncertainty’, American Economic Review (March 1978)

Honors and awards 
The French Legion of Honor

Citations

External links 
 Bio on the INSEAD Website

French economists
Academic staff of INSEAD
1947 births
Living people